The 2015 XION Rally Argentina was a motor racing event for rally cars that was held over four days between 23 and 26 April 2015. It marked the thirty-fifth running of the Rally Argentina, and was the fourth round of the 2015 World Rally Championship and WRC-2 seasons.

The rally was won by Kris Meeke who, alongside his co-driver Paul Nagle, became the first British rally driver to win a WRC rally since 2002.

Entry list

Results

Event standings

Special stages

Championship standings after the event

WRC

Drivers' Championship standings

Manufacturers' Championship standings

Other

WRC2 Drivers' Championship standings

WRC3 Drivers' Championship standings

JWRC Drivers' Championship standings

References

External links
 
 The official website of the World Rally Championship

Argentina
Rally Argentina
Rally